The DL class are a class of diesel locomotives built by Clyde Engineering, Kelso for Australian National between 1988 and 1990. Five remain in service with Pacific National.

History

The first of the 15 commenced trials between Clyde Engineering's, Kelso plant and Lithgow in February 1988. The last was delivered in February 1990. They were used on Australian National's standard gauge network on Freight and Passenger traffic from Broken Hill to Adelaide, Alice Springs and Kalgoorlie. In 1995, all 15 were transferred with Australian National's interstate operations to National Rail.

In January 1996, DL37 was destroyed in the Hines Hill train collision. In June 1999, National Rail began operating blue metal trains in New South Wales from Dunmore to Cooks River and in November 1999, from Marulan to Port Kembla both with DLs.

All were included in the sale of National Rail to Pacific National in February 2002. As of January 2014, operational class members were being used on Pacific National freight services in New South Wales, Victoria and South Australia and as second locomotives on the Indian Pacific between Sydney to Adelaide. DL36 had been in storage at Port Augusta since at least 2008 and was cut up during 2018. 

During May 2016, the class were replaced by 82 class and G class locomotives in the Adelaide hills. During the month DL47 ran as part of light engine movement D171 from Enfield Yard to Lithgow with 8151 leading stored locos X50, DL47, X49 & G519. DL42 & DL45 also ran on light engine D171 on the 25 May heading to Lithgow from Enfield Yard with 8162 leading X48, DL42, S306 & DL45. On 1 December 2016, 8129 lead DL45, DL44, DL50 and DL42 on a light engine movement to Port Kembla for reactivation work for grain haulage. The class have since been used in South Australia on grain workings during 2018 and 2019, but are commonly found in the Werris Creek area on grain services to the port of Newcastle.

Status table

References

Clyde Engineering locomotives
Co-Co locomotives
Pacific National diesel locomotives
Railway locomotives introduced in 1988
Standard gauge locomotives of Australia
Diesel-electric locomotives of Australia